NQ Dry Tropics (formerly Burdekin Dry Tropics NRM) is the natural resource management body for the Burdekin Dry Tropics region. Based in Townsville, it is an independent, community based, not-for-profit organisation that has been delivering on-ground Natural Resource Management (NRM) activities since 2005 to enhance the sustainability of the region's natural resources including water, soil and biodiversity. 

The economy of the NQ Dry Tropics region is heavily reliant upon natural resources based industries, particularly agriculture. Agriculture is by far the most important employer in the rural areas of the region with well established grazing, sugarcane and horticultural industries. Other major industries include mining, energy and tourism.

History

The National Action Plan for Salinity and Water Quality (NAPSWQ) and the Natural Heritage Trust Extension (NHT2) were natural resource management programs established by the Australian Government, in partnership with State Governments, to address the declining condition of natural resources in Australia. The long term objectives of these programs was to halt and reverse the decline in the condition of the natural resource base. It also recognised that the long term success of Natural resource management activities depended on involvement of sectors of the community. 

The election of the Rudd Government saw development of the Caring for our Country program. It was a commitment of $2.25 billion in funding over the first five years commencing 1 July 2008.

Goals
Land care programs and sustainable farming.

Geography
The NQ Dry Tropics region is located in north eastern Queensland, covering an area of approximately 133,432 km² and is primarily defined by the catchment area of the Burdekin River plus the associated coastal and marine areas. The region has a population of approximately 240,000 which is mostly concentrated in the major population centres of Townsville, Ayr, Bowen and Charters Towers. Outside of these major centres the region has sparsely populated pastoral properties and mines.

Major watercourses
Major water courses in this catchment include:

 Basalt River
 Belyando River
 Bogie River
 Bohle River
 Bowen River
 Broken River

 Burdekin River
 Campaspe River
 Cape River
 Clarke River
 Don River

 Dry River
 Fanning River
 Haughton River
 Ross River
 Running River

 Sellheim River
 Star River
 Suttor River

Bioregions
There are 6 of 15 bioregions (as defined by Interim Biogeographic Regionalisation for Australia) that exist within the Burdekin Dry Tropics NRM region. These are: 
 Brigalow Belt North
 Brigalow Belt South
 Central Mackay Coast
 Desert Uplands
 Einasleigh Uplands
 Wet Tropics

Projects
 Landholders Driving Change
Land Resource Assessment for the Burdekin Dry Tropics region
 Burdekin Water Quality Improvement Plan

References

Environmental organisations based in Australia
Nature conservation in Australia
Non-profit organisations based in Queensland
Organizations established in 2002
2002 establishments in Australia